Tesi is a surname. Notable people with the surname include:

 Henri Tesi (1903–?), French racing cyclist
 Luciano Tesi (born 1931), Italian astronomer
 Mauro Antonio Tesi (1730–1766), Italian painter
 Riccardo Tesi (born 1956), Italian musician
 Tesi Niu (born 2001), Tongan international rugby league footballer 
 Vittoria Tesi (fl. 18th century), Italian opera singer

See also
 Təsi, village in Azerbaijan

Italian-language surnames